Adolfo Domínguez Fernández (born on 14 May, 1950) is a Spanish fashion designer. In 2014, he won the National Designer Prize. Dominguez studied Philosophy and Arts, specialising in Art at Santiago University.

Fashion business
He took over his father's fashion boutique in Ourense in the early 1970s. He spent the following years developing his own designs, and finally made the big jump with a presentation of his work in Madrid in 1981. He also became the first Spanish designer to open his own brand-name store in Madrid, which grew into a chain with outlets across Spain and abroad. The company went public in 1997. Adolfo Dominguez S.A. currently has a network of around 400 branches, 98 of which are outside Spain. Annual turnover around 182 million euros.

Style
His perfume line is owned by Puig.

References

External links

1950 births
Living people
People from the Province of Ourense
Spanish fashion designers
Businesspeople from Galicia (Spain)
Luxury brands
Spanish brands